Bensenville is a village located near O'Hare International Airport in DuPage County, Illinois, with a portion of the town in Cook County. As of the 2020 census, the village population was 18,813.

First known as Tioga, it was formally established as Bensenville in 1873 along the Milwaukee Road (now Canadian Pacific) right-of-way.  The community is named after Bensen, Germany, a village in the municipality of Sudwalde.  A post office was established in 1873, but because there was an existing "Benson", the suffix "ville" was added.

The Edge Ice Arena is located in Bensenville, former home of the Chicago Steel junior ice hockey team.

The Churchville School in Bensenville is listed on the National Register of Historic Places.

History
The Barker-Karpis Gang used a house on May Street to hide kidnap victims William Hamm, Jr in 1933 and Edward Bremer in 1934, who they had kidnapped from Saint Paul, Minnesota.

Geography

Schools
Bensenville School District 100:
Fenton High School which serves both Bensenville and Wood Dale
Bensenville School District 2:
Blackhawk Middle School
Tioga School
W.A. Johnson School
Private:
Zion-Concord Lutheran School, Private 3-year-old Preschool through 8th grade.

Demographics
As of the 2020 census there were 18,813 people, 6,661 households, and 4,274 families residing in the village. The racial makeup of the village was 46.19% White, 4.17% African American, 4.94% Asian, 2.23% Native American, 0.01% Pacific Islander, 25.73% from other races, and 16.74% from two or more races. Hispanic or Latino of any race were 51.55% of the population.

There were 6,661 households, out of which 57.71% had children under the age of 18 living with them, 46.30% were married couples living together, 12.73% had a female householder with no husband present, and 35.84% were non-families. 29.43% of all households were made up of individuals, and 11.48% had someone living alone who was 65 years of age or older. The average household size was 3.40 and the average family size was 2.70.

The village's age distribution consisted of 23.2% under the age of 18, 9.4% from 18 to 24, 28.8% from 25 to 44, 25.5% from 45 to 64, and 13.1% who were 65 years of age or older. The median age was 35.9 years. For every 100 females, there were 101.7 males. For every 100 females age 18 and over, there were 99.3 males.

The median income for a household in the village was $64,401, and the median income for a family was $77,151. Males had a median income of $39,310 versus $32,728 for females. The per capita income for the village was $27,530. About 7.4% of families and 10.2% of the population were below the poverty line, including 19.6% of those under age 18 and 6.7% of those age 65 or over.

Transportation 

Bensenville has a station on Metra's Milwaukee District/West Line, which provides daily rail service between Elgin and Chicago (at Union Station). From there, passengers can connect to Amtrak trains.

Economy

Top employers
According to Bensenville's 2021 Annual Comprehensive Financial Report, the top employers in the village are:

In popular culture
Bensenville is the site of Victory Auto Wreckers, a  auto recycling facility on Green Street which has repeatedly aired the "door-falling-off-the-car" commercial, starring Bob Zajdel, on Chicago television stations since 1981.

Bensenville is mentioned by name in the movie Flatliners, and a scene was filmed at the old green house that was next to Blackhawk Junior High School in 1990.

In the television series Boss, a multi-episode story arc involves the main character, Mayor of Chicago Tom Kane (Kelsey Grammer), being damaged by a scandal in which he authorized the dumping of carcinogenic chemicals that soak into the groundwater of Bensenville.

Sister cities
  Zihuatanejo, Guerrero, Mexico

Notable people 

 Daren Dochterman is an art designer and illustrator for over 35 feature films including The Abyss, and Star Trek: The Motion Picture.
 Richard Oruche, basketball player for the Nigerian National Basketball Team. He competed in the 2012 Olympic Games. He played basketball for the Fenton Bison, Bensenville's high school.
 William A. Redmond was a longtime Democratic member of the Illinois House of Representatives who served as Speaker from 1975-1981.
 Genevieve "Audrey" Wagner was a professional baseball player in the All-American Girls Professional Baseball League, winning the league's batting title in 1948. She later earned an M.D. and pilots license.
Marcin Kleczynski, Polish-born Malwarebytes CEO who grew up in Bensenville.

References

External links

 
1884 establishments in Illinois
Chicago metropolitan area
Populated places established in 1884
Villages in Cook County, Illinois
Villages in DuPage County, Illinois
Villages in Illinois